Adeola Lanre Runsewe  (born 1 December 1989) is a Nigerian professional footballer who plays as a midfielder for Turkish Cypriot club Baf Ülkü Yurdu.

Career
On 19 June 2011, Runsewe's contract with HB Køge was turned into a professional one with a duration of two years.

Having joined Silkeborg IF in 2012 he left the club in summer 2016 after his contract ran out.

In February 2017 Runsewe signed for Faroese club ÍF Fuglafjørður.

On 7 September 2019, Runsewe joined Turkish Cypriot club Baf Ülkü Yurdu.

References

External links
 Official Danish Superliga stats 
 

1989 births
Living people
People from Sagamu
Yoruba sportspeople
Sportspeople from Ogun State
Nigerian footballers
Association football midfielders
Danish Superliga players
Danish 1st Division players
Lebanese Premier League players
F.C. Ebedei players
FC Midtjylland players
Skive IK players
Vendsyssel FF players
HB Køge players
Silkeborg IF players
Islah Borj Al Shmali Club players
Pepsi Football Academy players
Nigerian expatriate footballers
Nigerian expatriate sportspeople in Denmark
Expatriate men's footballers in Denmark
Nigerian expatriate sportspeople in Sweden
Expatriate footballers in Sweden
Nigerian expatriate sportspeople in the Faroe Islands
Expatriate footballers in the Faroe Islands
Nigerian expatriate sportspeople in Lebanon
Expatriate footballers in Lebanon
Nigerian expatriate sportspeople in Cyprus
Expatriate footballers in Cyprus